Blackia is a 2019 Punjabi-language, period action film directed by Sukhminder Dhanjal under the banner of HRI Productions and Ohri Productions. The film is produced by Vivek Ohri, Atul Ohri, Deepak Bali, Pranav and Mahesh Sharma. The film stars Dev Kharoud, Ihana Dhillon, Arsh Hundal and Ashish Duggal in lead roles. The film was released in cinemas on 3 May 2019.

Plot
In the 1970s Punjab gold smuggling was on its high. Gaama's father was a part of inter-national gold smuggling. His mother wants to see him living a respectful life so he refused to get corrupted. Later his father's enemies force him to step into the world of crime. He reaches the top of this business and realizes he is just a puppet of anti national agencies and than he tries to rectify his mistake.

Cast
Dev Kharoud as Gaama
Meharbaan Singh as Young Gaama
Ihana Dhillon as Sheetal
Parmod Pabbi as Iqbal Cheema
Arsh Hundal as Billa
Ashish Duggal as Gajjan Singh
Sanju Solanki as Jagar Singh, Gaama's father
Ekkta Singh as Naseeb, Gaama's mother
Rana Jung Bahadur as Roshan Lal Suniyar, Sheetal's father
Kumar John as Gulzar, Cheema's associate
Lucky Dhaliwal as Swaran Bhau
Ravinder Mand as Sukha
Tarsem Paul as Baba Subeg Singh
Naginder Gakhar as Thanedaar Baghel Singh
Goni Sagoo as Sheetal's mother
Rajat Manchanda as Sheetal's brother
Robby Atwal as Shindi, Gaama's sister
Sharanpreet as Professor Gul

Production
The film was announced in October 2018 while the shooting began in November 2018. The film was shot in parts of Punjab, Bathinda and Faridkot.
The teaser of the film was released on 8 March 2019. The trailer of the film was released on 1 April 2019.

Music
The music of the film is composed by Jaidev Kumar, Gurmeet Singh, Desi Crew and K.V. Singh while the background score is composed by Amar Mohile.

Release

Theatrical
The film was released worldwide in cinemas on 3 May 2019.

Home media
The film is also available on Amazon Prime Video for digital streaming.

External links

References

2019 films
Punjabi-language Indian films